The 20th Virginia Cavalry Regiment was a cavalry regiment raised in Virginia for service in the Confederate States Army during the American Civil War. It fought mostly in western Virginia.

Virginia's 20th Cavalry Regiment was organized in August, 1863, and was composed of "North Western Virginians." The unit served in W.L. Jackson's Brigade and confronted the Federals in western Virginia and in the Shenandoah Valley. It disbanded in mid-April, 1865. The field officers were Colonel W.W. Arnett, Lieutenant Colonels Dudley Evans and John B. Lady, and Major Elihu Hutton.

Companies and officers

In popular culture
In the science fiction short story, Field Test by Keith Laumer, a newly designed and built artificially intelligent superheavy tank called a Bolo Mark XX Model B is assigned to "the 20th Virginia, a regiment ancient and honorable, with a history dating back to Terra Insula".

See also

List of Virginia Civil War units
List of West Virginia Civil War Confederate units

References

Units and formations of the Confederate States Army from Virginia
1863 establishments in Virginia
Military units and formations established in 1863
1865 disestablishments in Virginia
Military units and formations disestablished in 1865